Horst Skoff was the defending champion, but lost in the final this year.

Thomas Muster won the title, defeating Skoff 6–2, 6–4 in the final.

Seeds

Draw

Finals

Top half

Bottom half

External links
 ATP main draw

Singles